Jonathan Charles Frederick, hereditary Chief of the Miskito Nation, was the son of Princess Matilda, who was the daughter of H.M. Robert Charles Frederic, King of the Miskito Nation, by a junior wife. He succeeded after the abdication of his cousin, 8 March 1889, but died after falling from a horse,  8 July 1890.

Miskito people
1890 deaths
Year of birth missing